William d'Évreux may refer to:

William, Count of Évreux (d. 1118)
William d'Évreux, Norman nobleman, uncle of Count William, son of Robert II (archbishop of Rouen) and father of Judith d'Évreux, Countess of Sicily

See also
William Devereux (disambiguation)